Châteauneuf-Villevieille is a commune in the Alpes-Maritimes department in southeastern France.

History

The village was founded in the Middle Ages by inhabitants of nearby Contes. They were seeking a site sheltered from the instability in the valley at the time.

Jean de Revest (?-1347) was the coseigneur (lord) of Châteauneuf. He was a knight, a judge in Avignon (1314), grand judge of Piedmont (1322), judge of appeal of the Kingdom of Sicily (1331), and lieutenant to the seneschal (1340). 
Born to a family that had been in Nice since the late 13th century, he later moved to Aix. In 1309 or 1310 he married Sybille Chabaud, lady of Châteauneuf and daughter of the noble Boniface Chabaud.

The territory of Bendejun and Cantaron belonged formerly to the commune. They were separated in 1911 to form separate communes.

Formerly called Châteauneuf, the commune was renamed Châteauneuf-de-Contes in 1961. In 1992, the name was changed again to Châteauneuf-Villevieille.

Geography
, in the Férion mountain range.

Population

Sights
At its center is a 12th-century church.

See also
Communes of the Alpes-Maritimes department

References

External links
 Châteauneuf-Villevieille on Provenceweb 
 Personal website about the ruins of the medieval village 

Communes of Alpes-Maritimes
Alpes-Maritimes communes articles needing translation from French Wikipedia